Ernesto Vargas Rodríguez (born May 1, 1961) is a former Uruguayan footballer.

Career 
Vargas started in 1979 playing for Peñarol until 1986. En 1987 he signed for Nacional, staying with them till 1988. That year he went to Spain, joining the Real Oviedo. In 1990, he joined LDU Quito of Ecuador. In 1990, he returned to Uruguay's Nacional, and in 1991 to Perú where he played for Universitario, where he finally retired.

Clubs 
Source:

References 

1961 births
Living people
Uruguayan footballers
Uruguay international footballers
Uruguay under-20 international footballers
Uruguayan expatriate footballers
Uruguayan Primera División players
La Liga players
Peñarol players
Club Nacional de Football players
Real Oviedo players
L.D.U. Quito footballers
Club Universitario de Deportes footballers
Expatriate footballers in Spain
Expatriate footballers in Ecuador
Expatriate footballers in Peru
Uruguayan expatriate sportspeople in Ecuador
Association football defenders